The 1963 NCAA College Division basketball tournament involved 32 schools playing in a single-elimination tournament to determine the national champion of men's NCAA College Division college basketball as a culmination of the 1962–63 NCAA College Division men's basketball season. It was won by South Dakota State University, with South Dakota State's Wayne Rasmussen named Most Outstanding Player.

Regional participants

Regionals

South Central - Louisville, Kentucky
Location: Knights Hall Host: Bellarmine College

Third Place - Bellarmine 96, Austin Peay 86

East - Reading, Pennsylvania
Location: Bollman Center Host: Albright College

Third Place - Hofstra 78, Mount St. Mary's 71

Mideast - Akron, Ohio
Location: Memorial Hall Host: Municipal University of Akron

Third Place—Youngstown State 65, Buffalo 53

Northeast—⁣Boston, Massachusetts
Location: Cabot Center Host: Northeastern University

Third Place—Assumption 66, Fairleigh Dickinson 51

Great Lakes - St. Louis, Missouri
Location: Washington Field House Host: Washington University in St. Louis

Third Place—Concordia 92, Augustana (IL) 84

Southwest - Cape Girardeau, Missouri
Location: Houck Field House Host: Southeast Missouri State College

Third Place—Arkansas State 77, SE Missouri State 75

Midwest - Brookings, South Dakota
Location: The Barn Host: South Dakota State College

Third Place - Michigan Tech 71, Cornell 61

Pacific Coast - Fresno, California
Location: North Gym Host: Fresno State College

Third Place—UC Santa Barbara 58, San Francisco State 56

*denotes each overtime played

National Finals—⁣Evansville, Indiana
Location: Roberts Municipal Stadium Host: Evansville College

Third Place—Oglethorpe 68, Southern Illinois 64

*denotes each overtime played

All-tournament team
 Tom Black (South Dakota State)
 Bob Cherry (Wittenberg)
 Bill Fisher (Wittenberg)
 Wayne Rasmussen (South Dakota State)
 Al Thrasher (Wittenberg)

See also
 1963 NCAA University Division basketball tournament
 1963 NAIA Basketball Tournament

References

Sources
 2010 NCAA Men's Basketball Championship Tournament Records and Statistics: Division II men's basketball Championship
 1963 NCAA College Division Men's Basketball Tournament jonfmorse.com

NCAA Division II men's basketball tournament
Tournament
NCAA College Division basketball tournament
NCAA College Division basketball tournament